Cour-l'Évêque is a commune in the Haute-Marne department in north-eastern France.

Geography
The village lies on the right bank of the Aujon, which flows northwestward through the southern part of the commune.

See also
Communes of the Haute-Marne department

References

Courleveque